7 Seeds (stylized as 7SEEDS) is a Japanese manga series written and illustrated by Yumi Tamura. It is set in a post-apocalyptic future, long enough after a meteorite hits Earth that new species have evolved, and follows the struggles of five groups of young adults to survive after they are revived from cryonic preservation. The title comes from five groups of individuals in cryogenic chambers along with supplies, called "seeds", laid down by the Japanese government.

The manga was originally serialized in Shogakukan's Bessatsu Shōjo Comic magazine, premiering in the November 2001 issue; it transferred to Flowers magazine in April 2002, where it ran until its conclusion in May 2017. Shogakukan collected the individual chapters into 35 bound volumes.

An original net animation (ONA) anime adaptation, produced by Gonzo and directed by Yukio Takahashi, was announced in November 2018. The first season was released worldwide on Netflix in June 2019. A second season produced by Studio Kai premiered on 26 March 2020.

In 2007, 7 Seeds won the 52nd Shogakukan Manga Award for the shōjo category. Including digital sales, it has sold more than 6 million copies in Japan.

Story

When astronomers predict that the Earth will be hit by a meteorite, the world leaders meet to develop a plan for human survival called the Seven Seeds project. Each country agrees to preserve numbers of healthy young people through cryogenics, which will allow them to survive the devastation of the impact. After a computer determines that Earth is once again safe for human life, it will revive each group. The Japanese government creates five groups of survivors named Winter, Spring, Summer A, Summer B, and Fall. Each group consists of seven members, who are not told about what will happen before they are placed in cryonic preservation, and one adult guide who is trained in wilderness survival. These groups are scattered across Japan: the Summer groups in southern and northern Kyūshū, Fall in western Honshū, Spring in central Honshū near Tokyo, and Winter in Hokkaidō. 

Awoken from the cryogenic sleep many years later, the young men and women find themselves amidst a hostile environment bare of any human life. Their former home country Japan has greatly changed. Completely alone, they must depend only on themselves to survive in the new world.

Setting
7 Seeds takes place an unknown number of years after the collision of a large meteorite with Earth. As a result of the impact, the climate of Japan has greatly changed from what the characters knew from the present day. In the Kansai region there are only two seasons, a dry season and a longer, heavier rainy season. Takahiro of Winter group describes the winters in the northern island of Hokkaidō as being as mild as in Kanagawa Prefecture where he grew up. In addition, sea levels have risen greatly: downtown Yokohama is completely underwater, only the top hand of the statue in Nagasaki Peace Park is above the surface of the ocean. The geography of Japan has changed as well: after an eruption of Mount Aso, Kyūshū has been split into two islands, and the Kansai region is separated from central Honshū by a wide strait. The series depicts a Japan in which, as a result of the new environment and mass extinctions, ecosystems have changed and several new species of animals and plants have evolved.

For example, on the island where Summer group B first lands, off the coast of Nagasaki Prefecture, Botan notes how few of the ecological niches are filled, including no birds or flying insects, and that the limited number of species are still radiating to fill empty niches. In particular, a local rodent resembling a rabbit is in the process of speciation into herbivorous and ravenously carnivorous versions, which are still visually similar. Other dangers new to the characters include swarms of carnivorous white cockroaches and gigantic Venus flytraps, sundews, and nepenthes. Species that are unchanged but were previously unknown in Japan include banana trees and crocodiles. Semimaru notes that neither on the island nor on the Kyūshū mainland do they see any ants, bees, or similar insects.

In the Kansai region, Fall group domesticates flightless birds about the size of a chicken and sheep that have grown to resemble llamas, which can be ridden, milked and shorn for wool. Izayoi tells Natsu that a local wasp is deadly, killing with a single sting, and another species has a sting that sickens the victim for a day. According to Akio, corn is the only crop from their seed cache that grows in the area's soils, but Fall group also cultivates a variety of tobacco with a narcotic effect when smoked.

In the southern part of central Honshū, Natsu, Arashi, and Semimaru of Summer group B cross a desert with cactus scrub. Throughout the region they find remains of large reptiles that revive from estivation during the rainy season, which remind Natsu of velociraptors from Jurassic Park. These "dinosaurs", as the characters call them, have grassland and woodland varieties, and during the rainy season are the dominant predator from the south coast to at least as far north as Tokyo.

On the island where the Spring group first lands, off the coast of the Kantō region, Hana notes that there are no vertebrates on land or in the sea, and Momotaro describes the ecology as similar to that of the Carboniferous Era. On land, there are giant insects the characters call "boat beetles" and swarms of bees with stings that are painful but not deadly, which force the group to live on rafts off-shore. In the island's swamps, there are giant praying mantis and giant dragonflies. While at the island, the group lives off shellfish and shallow-water nautiluses, but see no bony fish. The characters find the climate changed as well, as it is too overcast to see the stars for the first two weeks after they are awake, even though it is spring, a season that in the present day is noted for clear weather.

On the mainland of the Kantō region, Spring group meets large aquatic lizards living among the submerged ruins of Yokohama, which hunt in groups. Nearby, in the ruins of central Tokyo, the party from Summer group B is attacked by a giant predatory fish, which Takahiro of Winter group identifies as descended from a deep-sea fish, the only kind of bony fishes to have survived. They also meet a fungus-like growth Takahiro calls "blue mucus", which infects Hana's skin when she touches it. This growth goes dormant in the dry season, and Takahiro realizes it is intolerant to salt and uses it to cure her.

In northern Honshū near Sendai, Natsu, Arashi and Semimaru of Summer group B find the first flowers they have seen during their journey over most of the length of Japan.

In southern Hokkaidō, Winter group encounters grasslands populated by many mammals they do not know, including small-eared rodents, herds of unknown ruminants, and tigers with saber-teeth. They also meet wolves with the ability to project illusions normally used to help hunt.

The project organizers also prepared sealed caches containing seeds and instructional books near the "seven Fuji". These seven Fuji are not related to the famous Mount Fuji, but are regional landmarks also named Fuji: 

 Bungo Fuji in Ōita Prefecture is Mt. Yufudake, where the cache is marked by a statue of the Buddha Vairocana.
 Ogino Fuji in Kanagawa Prefecture is Mt. Kyogatake, where the cache is marked by a statue of Monjubosatsu, the bodhisattva Manjusri.
 Kobe Fuji in Hyogo Prefecture is Mount Futatabi of the Rokkō Mountains, marked by a statue of Acala (Fudō myō-ō).
 Natori Fuji in Miyagi Prefecture is Mt. Taihaku, near Sendai, where the cache is marked by a statue of Kokūzō Bosatsu (Ākāśagarbha).
 Akan Fuji in Hokkaidō is Mt. Meakandake, where the cache is marked by a statue of Avalokiteśvara, the goddess of mercy.
 Tosa Fuji in Kumamoto Prefecture is Mount Takamori, marked by a statue of Mahāsthāmaprāpta.
 Noto Fuji in Ishikawa Prefecture is Mount Takatsume-ya, where the cache is marked by a statue of goddess Kukurihime.
 Fuji is a ghost ship with similar capabilities to the RP FLIP. The ghost ship is adrift at sea in a vast ship graveyard. It is marked by a painting of the buddha Samantabhadra riding on a white elephant's back. This Fuji was the only one kept hidden and used as a humans' shelter at the same time.

Development and production
In an author's note, Tamura says that 7 Seeds was inspired by news reports that near-Earth object (89959) 2002 NT7 might potentially collide with Earth.

Songs
Yumi Tamura often includes certain songs in her chapter titles. If there is further info material available, you can find it using the links in the 'manga' table.

There are also songs that do not appear in chapter titles but still play a major role at turning points in the manga. Those are listed below.

 Bridge Over Troubled Water (by Simon and Garfunkel). Appeared in Volume 3, East Wind Chapter 2, Spirit of Sound.
 Die Fledermaus (The Bat) (by Johann Strauss II). Appeared in Volume 14, Summer Solstice Chapter 11, Tell.
 Clair de lune (by Claude-Achille Debussy). Appeared in Volume 14, Summer Solstice Chapter 12, Know.
 Minute Waltz (by Frédéric François Chopin). Appeared in Volume 14, Summer Solstice Chapter 13, Hate.
 Eine kleine Nachtmusik (by Wolfgang Amadeus Mozart). Appeared in Volume 16, Summer Solstice Chapter 23, Farewell.
 Csikós Post (by Hermann Necke). Appeared in Volume 16, Summer Solstice Chapter 23, Farewell.
 Pomp and Circumstance (by Sir Edward William Elgar). Appeared in Volume 16, Summer Solstice Chapter 23, Farewell.
 Nutcracker Suite (originally choreographed by Marius Petipa and Lev Ivanov with a score by Pyotr Ilyich Tchaikovsky). Appeared in Volume 16, Summer Solstice Chapter 23, Farewell.
 Orphée aux enfers (Orpheus in the Underworld) (by Jacques Offenbach). Appeared in Volume 16, Summer Solstice Chapter 23, Farewell.

The four seasons
The four seasons serve as the theme for 7 Seeds , since every team is named after one of them: Spring, Summer A/B, Autumn, and Winter. The team members were chosen into their teams based on which seasons their names matched best.

Almost every 7 Seeds chapter arc is named after one of the 24 solar terms consisting of the 72 pentads (Shichijūni kō). The Rainwater chapter, for example, completely consists of Shichijūni kō.

Media

Manga

7 Seeds was written and illustrated by Yumi Tamura and published by Shogakukan. It began serialization in the November 2001 issue of the monthly shōjo (aimed at teenage girls) manga magazine Bessatsu Shōjo Comic. In April 2002, it transferred to the monthly josei (aimed at young adult women) manga magazine Flowers. The final chapter was published in the July 2017 issue of Flowers, released on 27 May. 

Shogakukan collected the individual chapters into 35 bound volumes, printed under the Flower Comics imprint, and later, under the Flower Comics Alpha imprint. The first volume was released on 26 March 2002; the last volume was released on 10 August 2017. Each volume was divided into sections focusing on different groups of survivors, with section titles containing a kigo (seasonal word) appropriate for the group name. Shogakukan also published an official fanbook, titled Edge of Emotions, on 9 December 2011. The fanbook contained detailed character profiles, a color illustration gallery, and a long interview with Tamura.

In 2008, Pika Édition licensed the manga in France, where it was marketed as a seinen (aimed at young adult men) manga series. In 2011, Pika announced that negotiations with the Japanese publisher, Shogakukan, had been unsuccessful, and therefore, they would cease publishing 7 Seeds and two other titles. In total, Pika published 10 volumes of the manga in French.

In 2017, after the conclusion of the 7 Seeds manga in Japan, Tamura announced the launch of a spin-off series in Flowers. The first chapter was published in the magazine's October issue, released on 28 August; the final chapter was published in the December issue, released on 28 October. Shogakukan collected the chapters into a single bound volume on 10 January 2018.

Drama CDs
7 Seeds was adapted into a radio drama which was broadcast in Japan from 9 December 2003 to 6 February 2004. The nine episodes were collected on three drama CDs:

 7 Seeds 1, released on 26 March 2004, focuses on Summer group B and dramatizes the events of volume 1 of the manga.
 7 Seeds 2, released on 23 April 2004, focuses on Winter group and dramatizes events of volume 4 of the manga.
 7 Seeds 3, released on 21 May 2004, focuses on Spring group and dramatizes events of volumes 2 and 3 of the manga.

A fourth drama CD was released in Japan on 10 August 2017, bundled with a limited edition of volume 35 of the 7 Seeds manga. The story was based on an original scenario written by Yumi Tamura. Several voice actors who would later be cast in the anime adaptation of 7 Seeds were first featured on the drama CD, including Kazuhiko Inoue as Kaname Mozunoto, Shō Hayami as Takashi Sugurono, Nozomu Sasaki as Takahiro Aramaki, and Katsuyuki Konishi as Semimaru Asai.

Anime
An anime adaptation was announced on 26 November 2018. The series is animated by Gonzo and directed by Yukio Takahashi, with Touko Machida handling series composition, Youko Satou designing the characters, and Michiru composing the music. The series was originally scheduled to release on Netflix in April 2019, but it was delayed to 28 June 2019 due to production delays. Amatsuki performed the series' opening theme song "Ark", while Majiko performed the series' ending theme song "WISH".

A second season premiered on 26 March 2020. The main cast and staff members reprised their roles, and Studio Kai producing the animation. Mone Kamishiraishi performed the second season's opening theme song "From the Seeds", which was composed by Glim Spanky, while Cider Girl performed the second season's ending theme "Synchro".

On 4 January 2021, the staff members announced that the second season's ending animation sequence has been removed after they were notified that it had similarities to the anime Beyond the Boundary'''s ending theme.

Season 1 (2019)

Season 2 (2020)

Reception7 Seeds won the 52nd Shogakukan Manga Award for the shōjo category in 2007. The series ranked number 10 on the top 20 list of manga for female readers in the 2018 edition of Takarajimasha's Kono Manga ga Sugoi!'' guidebook. It was nominated in the comic category for the 49th Seiun Awards in 2018.

Including digital sales, the series has sold more than 6 million copies in Japan. Volume 12 reached number 7 on the Tohan best-seller list and volume 13 reached number 10.

References

External links
 
 
 Official anime website 
 Official drama CD website 
 7 Seeds on Netflix
 Interview with Yumi Tamura about 7 Seeds 

2001 manga
2019 anime ONAs
Gonzo (company)
Japanese-language Netflix original programming
Josei manga
Netflix original anime
Post-apocalyptic anime and manga
Shogakukan manga
Shōjo manga
Studio Kai
Survival anime and manga
Winners of the Shogakukan Manga Award for shōjo manga